Parakanchia is a genus of moths in the subfamily Lymantriinae. The genus was erected by George Thomas Bethune-Baker in 1908. The species are found in New Guinea.

Species
Parakanchia irregularis (Bethune-Baker, 1904)
Parakanchia cyclops Collenette, 1951
Parakanchia opaca Collenette, 1955

References

Lymantriinae